William Thomas Wilson (born November 30, 1937) is an American attorney and politician who served from 1974 to 1990 in the Virginia House of Delegates. He was defeated for reelection in 1989 by Republican Bo Trumbo.

References

External links 
 

1937 births
Living people
Democratic Party members of the Virginia House of Delegates
20th-century American politicians